Pipotiazine (Piportil), also known as pipothiazine, is a typical antipsychotic of the phenothiazine class used in the United Kingdom and other countries for the treatment of schizophrenia. Its properties are similar to those of chlorpromazine. A 2004 systematic review investigated its efficacy for people with schizophrenia:

Synthesis

The alkylation of 2-Dimethylaminosulfonylphenthiazine [1090-78-4] (1) with 1-Bromo-3-chloropropane (2) gives 10-(3-chloropropyl)-N,N-dimethylphenothiazine-2-sulfonamide [40051-12-5] (3). Alkylation with 4-Piperidineethanol [622-26-4] (4) completes the synthesis of Pipothiazine (5).

See also
 Typical antipsychotic
 Phenothiazine

References

Phenothiazines
Typical antipsychotics
Piperazines
Primary alcohols
Sulfonamides
Dimethylamino compounds